KeyEast (stylized in all caps) is a management agency founded by actor Bae Yong-joon.

History
 October 8, 1996 – Tuneboom Korea Co., Ltd. (한국툰붐 주식회사) was established.
 November 2003 – Tuneboom Korea was listed at KOSDAQ.
 June 2004 – Tuneboom Korea changes corporate name to Auto Wintech Inc. (오토윈테크 주식회사).
 March 2006 – Auto Wintech changes again to its current name, KeyEast Co., Ltd. (주식회사 키이스트).
 July 2006 – KeyEast acquires BOF Corp. (주식회사 비오에프) and made it a subsidiary.
 February 2008 – KeyEast advances to Japan, forming BOF Entertainment.
 June 2008 – KeyEast organized a premium event for The Legend at the Osaka Dome.
 August 2008 – KeyEast opens the Japanese entertainment portal BOFI.
 January 2009 – KeyEast and JYP Entertainment established a joint venture, Holym. 
 May 2009 – KeyEast acquires Japanese company  and made it an affiliated company. After the acquition by SM Entertainment, it was re-named Stream Media Corporation.
 January 2010 – KeyEast and BOF Corp. merge into one company, with KeyEast as the surviving entity.
 December 2010 – KeyEast enters the television production industry through the Korean drama Dream High.
 July 2012 – KeyEast advances to China.
 March 2018 – SM Entertainment acquired KeyEast Entertainment with a controlling stake of 25.12%.
 March 2022 – KeyEast acquired production company Studio flow with a 31.58% stake.

Artists

Actors

 Bae Jung-nam (2021–present)
 Choi Sung-joon
 Hwang In-youp (2018–present)
 Jeong Ji-hwan
 Ji Hyun-joon
 Kim Dong-wook (2016–present)
 Kim Jae-chul
 Lee Dong-hwi (2020–present)
 Lee Tae-vin (2021–present)
 Shin Yun-seob
 Woo Do-hwan
 Yoo Hae-jin (2021–present)
 Yoon Jong-hoon (2021–present)

Actresses

 Chae Jung-an (2020–present)
 Go Ah-sung (2020–present)
 Han Sun-hwa (2020–present)
 Han Sung-min (2021–present)
 Hwang Se-on (2021–present)
 Ji Hye-won
 Jo Bo-ah (2021–present)
 Jung Eun-chae (2019–present)
 Kang Han-na (2020–present)
 Kim Sae-byuk
 Kim Seo-hyung (2020–present)
 Kim Si-eun
 Moon Ga-young (2018–present)
 Park Ha-sun (2019–present)
 Park Soo-jin (2014–present)
 Yoon Bo-ra (2020–present)

Former artists 

The Ark (2015–2016)
Ahn So-hee (2015–2018)
Bae Noo-ri (20??–2017)
Bong Tae-gyu (????–2014)
Choi Kang-hee (2007–2014)
Goo Hara (2016–2019)
Han Bo-reum (20??–2020)
Han Ye-seul (2014–2018)
Hong Ji-yoon (2016-2023)
Hong Soo-hyun (2007–2019)
Im Soo-jung (2011–2015)
In Gyo-jin (2015–2020)
Ji Soo  (2020–2021)
Jo Woo-ri (2016–2022)
Ju Ji-hoon (2011–2021)
Jung Ryeo-won (2012–2020)
Kang Ji-young (2019-2022)
Kim Hee-chan (2014-2022)
Kim Hyun Joong (2010–2020)
Kim Ju-na (2015–2018)
Kim Min-seo (2010–2014)
Kim Soo-hyun (2010–2019)
Ko Sung-hee (2011–2013)
Kwon Ri-se (2011–2013)
Lee Bo-young (2009–2011)
Lee Da-in (2013–2018)
Lee Hyun-woo (2011–2019)
Lee Ji-ah (2007–2011)
Lee Na-young (2006–2011)
Park Eun-bin (2010–2015)
Park Ji-bin (2009–2014)
Park Jung-yeon (2019–2022)
Park Seo-joon (2014–2018)
Park Su-Bin (2018–2020)
Seo Hyo-rim (2017–2019)
So Yi-hyun (2010–2020)
Son Dam-bi (2015–2020)
Son Hyun-joo (2015–2021)
Wang Ji-hye (2009–2015)
Uhm Jung-hwa (2015–2018)
Uhm Tae-woong (2015–2017)
Yoon Han (2015–2016)

Partnership
 JYP Entertainment - Holym (formerly Dream High) (2009–2013, terminated)
 SM Entertainment - Acquisition of KeyEast (2018–present)

References

External links 
 
 

Mass media companies established in 1996
Talent agencies of South Korea
South Korean record labels
SM Entertainment subsidiaries